Amorots-Succos is a commune in the Pyrénées-Atlantiques department in the Nouvelle-Aquitaine region of southwestern France.

The inhabitants of the commune are known as Amoroztar in Basque

Geography
Amorots-Succos is located some 50 km east by south-east of Bayonne and 10 km north-west of Saint-Palais in the former Basque province of Lower Navarre. It can be accessed by the D123 road from Beguios in the east passing west through the village and the commune and continuing to La Bastide-Clairence. The D14 from Meharin to Garris also passes through the southern tip of the commune. The commune is mixed forest and farmland with no other villages or hamlets.

Hydrography
Numerous streams rise and flow through the commune including the Ruisseau d'Isaac Berds which forms part of the western border and flows to the Laharanne which eventually joins the Lihoury far to the north, the Jelesseko Erika forming the south-eastern border, the Ruisseau de Cherrits in the south, the Ruisseau d'Otherguy, and many other unnamed streams.

Places and Hamlets

Aguerréa
Ameztoya (ruins)
Amiasorhoa
Ansobieta
Apatia
Apetchéko Borda
Arangoïza
Arangoïzgaraya
Arrabichta
Berdeko Borda
Berhuéta
Bertrahandy
Bibens
Bidamberrita
Bidegain-de-Gain
Bidegain-de-Pé
Biscayluzia
Bordaberria
Cachantéguy
Carricaburua
Chastriaborda (ruins)
Culuteguia
Damassia
Ehulondoa
Errékaldéa
Errékartéa
Etchebérria
Etcheverria
Etorania
Garatéa
Garateko Borda
Haranéa
Ichobox
Ichorotzia
Idiartia
Iratzéburia
Isaac-Borda
Jauberria
Jelosséa
Joanteguia
Kakila
Kurku
Larraldéa (2 places)
Larréa
Lascouéta
Laurenzenia
Legarria
Miscoria
Olha
Olhakoborda
Olharanne
Ospilatéa
Oxarania
Pacharreta
Padagoya
Sarhia
Sékailénia
Sorhuéta
Succos
Tipulatéya
Uhaldia

Toponymy
Brigitte Jobbé-Duval proposed a forest origin for Amorots meaning "the land of oaks". Succos derives from the Basque zoko meaning "isolated country".

The current spelling in Basque is Amorotze-Zokotze. Pierre Lhande, in his Basque-French Dictionary, indicated the spelling Sokueze for Succos.

The following table details the origins of the commune name and other names in the commune.

Sources:
Orpustan: Jean-Baptiste Orpustan,  New Basque Toponymy
Raymond: Topographic Dictionary of the Department of Basses-Pyrenees, 1863, on the page numbers indicated in the table. 

Origins:
Chapter: Chapter of Soule
Pamplona: Titles of Pamplona
Irissarry: Regulations of the Commandry of Irissarry

History
The village of Succos was united with Amorots on 16 August 1841.

Administration

List of Successive Mayors

Inter-Communality
The commune belongs to six inter-communal associations:
The Communauté d'agglomération du Pays Basque
the AEP Association of Mixe Country
the Energy Association of Pyrénées-Atlantiques
the inter-communal association for the operation of schools in Amikuze
the Association to promote Basque culture
the educational grouping association for Amorots-Succos, Arraute-Charritte, Béguios, Masparraute, and Orègue

Demography
In 1350 there were 5 fires at Amorots and 10 at Succos.

The fiscal census of 1412-1413 carried out on the orders of Charles III of Navarre compared to the census of 1551 of men and arms that are present in the Kingdom of Navarre on this side of the ports revealed a population in high growth. The first census showed 4 fires at Amorots while the second showed 13 (12 + 1 secondary fire). The same at Succos: the first census showed 5 fires and the second 19 (16 + 3 secondary fires).

The census of the population of Lower Navarre in 1695 counted 40 fires at Amorots and 32 at Succos. The total at the 1758 census was 74 fires at Amorots.

In 2017 the commune had 232 inhabitants.

From 1793 to 1836 the population above was only for Amorots which was separate from Succos. The population for Succos for that period is shown below:

Economy
The commune forms part of the Appellation d'origine contrôlée (AOC) zone of Ossau-iraty.

Culture and Heritage

Languages
According to the Map of the Seven Basque Provinces published in 1863 by Prince Louis-Lucien Bonaparte the dialect of Basque spoken in Amendeuix-Oneix is eastern low Navarrese.

Religious Heritage
Two religious sites in the commune are registered as historical monuments:
The Church of Saint-Martin of Succos, Cemetery, and old Guardhouse (12th century), The cemetery wall serves as a fronton.
The Parish Church of Saint Luce (1880) at Amorots.

Picture Gallery

Facilities
Education
Amorots-Succos, Masparraute, Orègue, Béguios, and Arraute-Charritte are associated through an educational regrouping (R.P.I. AMOBA)

See also
Communes of the Pyrénées-Atlantiques department

References

External links
AMOROTZE-ZOKOTZE in the Bernardo Estornés Lasa - Auñamendi Encyclopedia (Euskomedia Fundazioa) 
Amorots-Succos on Géoportail, National Geographic Institute (IGN) website 
Amorots and Succos on the 1750 Cassini Map

Communes of Pyrénées-Atlantiques
Lower Navarre